Plas Tan y Bwlch in Gwynedd, Wales, is the Snowdonia National Park environmental studies centre, administered by the National Park Authority.

The centre provides courses about the Snowdonia National Park and the surrounding region of Wales.

History
Plas Tan y Bwlch was built by the Oakeley family during the 19th century on the site of a first house probably built in the early 17th century.  Additions designed by the Chester architect John Douglas were made to the house for W. E. Oakley in 1872. The nearby Oakeley Arms Hotel was also once part of the estate but was sold off in the early 20th century.

The Oakeley family owned a huge slate quarry in Blaenau Ffestiniog from which slates were carried to Porthmadog by the Ffestiniog Railway which passed through the estate.

Plas Tan y Bwlch is thought to be the first house in North Wales with electric lighting powered from its own hydro-electric station, which was commissioned in the 1890s. A pipeline from the nearby Llyn Mair fed water to a Pelton wheel, which was located in a small power house on the hillside immediately behind the house. It ceased to operate soon after 1928, when the public hydro-electric power station at Maentwrog began supplying the area.  In June 2013 a new hydro-scheme, costing £420,000, and similarly tapping the water from Llyn Mair, was opened. The water falls  to the turbine, and the scheme is expected to meet most of the Plas' electricity needs.

The gardens are designated Grade II* on the Cadw/ICOMOS Register of Parks and Gardens of Special Historic Interest in Wales.

See also
List of gardens in Wales
Slate industry in Wales

References

External links
http://www.plastanybwlch.com/ Plas Tan y Bwlch website
http://www.bbc.co.uk/wales/northwest/sites/history/pages/plastanybwlch.shtml BBC Plas Tan-y-bwlch page

Maentwrog
Environmental studies institutions in Gwynedd
Environmental studies institutions in Snowdonia
Further education colleges in Gwynedd
Further education colleges in Snowdonia
Grade II* listed buildings in Gwynedd
Registered historic parks and gardens in Gwynedd
Adult education in the United Kingdom